Gandhinagar is a census town in Kolhapur district  in the state of Maharashtra, India.

Demographics
 India census, Gandhinagar had a population of 12,371. Males constitute 52% of the population and females 48%. Gandhinagar has an average literacy rate of 80%, higher than the national average of 59.5%: male literacy is 84%, and female literacy is 75%. In Gandhinagar, 12% of the population is under 6 years of age.

Sindhi is spoken by 73.34% of the population of Gandhinagar.

References

Cities and towns in Kolhapur district